David Ian Jones (born 22 March 1952) is a British politician and former solicitor serving as the Deputy Chairman of the European Research Group since March 2020 and as Member of Parliament (MP) for Clwyd West since 2005. A member of the Conservative Party, he has held several ministerial posts in Westminster; most recently as Minister of State at the Department for Exiting the European Union. Appointed on 17 July 2016, he was dismissed from his role on 12 June 2017.

He is the first Secretary of State for Wales to have served as an Assembly Member, as well as the first Conservative officeholder to represent a Welsh constituency since Nicholas Edwards (1979–1987). In 2016, Jones joined the political advisory board of Leave Means Leave.

Early life
David Jones was born in Stepney, London to Welsh parents, Elspeth and Bryn Jones, and is a Welsh speaker. His father was a British Army officer who served in northwest India and later ran pharmacies around the Wrexham area.

He was educated at Ruabon Grammar School, University College London – where he was an active member of UCL Conservative Society – and  Chester College of Law. He qualified as a solicitor in 1976, and was senior partner of a practice (David Jones & Company) based at Llandudno.

As a young solicitor he had worked in Ruthin alongside future Plaid Cymru Deputy Welsh First Minister Ieuan Wyn Jones. He also worked in a Bangor practice led by former Labour MP for Conwy, Sir Elwyn Jones.

Political career

Welsh Assembly
In 1999 he contested the seat of Conwy in the inaugural Assembly Elections. In 2002, Jones unexpectedly became a member of the Welsh Assembly for the North Wales electoral region, filling the seat vacated by the ex-Welsh Office minister Rod Richards, who had resigned for health reasons.

Jones made it clear from the outset that he would not seek re-election to the Assembly and stepped down at the 2003 elections.

Parliament
At the 2005 general election, Jones was elected as MP for Clwyd West, defeating the sitting Labour Party MP Gareth Thomas by a majority of 133 votes. This was his third candidacy for the Conservative Party in general elections; he had previously contested Conwy at the 1997 election and finished second to Labour's Christine Russell in the City of Chester in at the 2001 general election.

His maiden speech to the House of Commons was on 23 May 2005, when he focused on the needs of his rural constituency and on crime. He also expressed concern about wind farms planned for his constituency (the proposed Gwynt y Mor wind farm would be one of the biggest wind farms in the United Kingdom).

He was a member of the Welsh Affairs Select Committee from 2005 to 2010, and on 7 November 2006 was appointed Shadow Minister for Wales. He also takes a keen interest in law and order issues and was a member of the Conservative Homeland Security team.

He was a member of the Cornerstone Group between 2005 and 2007, according to WalesOnline.

On 6 May 2010, Jones was re-elected as Member of Parliament for Clwyd West with a substantially increased majority of 6,419. He was appointed Parliamentary Under Secretary of State at the Wales Office on 13 May 2010.

He was appointed Secretary of State for Wales on 4 September 2012, following David Cameron's first Cabinet reshuffle, and removed from office in another reshuffle on 14 July 2014. After Theresa May's appointment as Prime Minister, he was appointed as a Minister of State at the Department for Exiting the European Union. He was subsequently dismissed from this role on 12 June 2017.

A fluent Welsh language speaker, Jones also maintains an active blog. He has been known to give up his activity on social media for Lent. His constituency office is based in Colwyn Bay.

In February 2013, The Daily Telegraph reported that as Welsh Secretary Jones took a chauffeur-driven Jaguar on a journey of about 100 metres. A spokesman for the Welsh Office said: "The Secretary of State for Wales did travel by car to Cabinet today as he was reading Cabinet papers and briefing until his arrival at Downing Street."

Views on same-sex marriage
During an interview on ITV Wales Face to Face programme in February 2013, discussing a Parliamentary vote on the Marriage (Same Sex Couples) Bill on 5 February, Jones said: "I was one of two cabinet ministers who did vote against it and it was for various reasons. Certainly in constituency terms, I felt that overwhelmingly the constituents of Clwyd West were opposed to the change. But also  I regard marriage as an institution that has developed over many centuries, essentially for the provision of a warm and safe environment for the upbringing of children, which is clearly something that two same-sex partners can't do. Which is not to say that I'm in any sense opposed to stable and committed same-sex partnerships".

The gay rights organisation Stonewall issued a statement expressing disappointment at his comments. In a statement after the interview, Jones said: "I made the point of stressing that I was fully supportive of committed same-sex relationships. I simply sought to point out that, since same-sex partners could not biologically procreate children, the institution of marriage was one that, in my opinion, should be reserved to opposite-sex partners."

Blog 
In 2014, Jones was accused by fellow MP Guto Bebb of being co-author of the blog "Thoughts of Oscar". Jones denied having anything to do with the blog, for which local newsagent Nigel Roberts claimed full responsibility. Richie Windmill, the leader of the "Victims of Oscar" action group, was arrested in October 2015, along with his wife, on suspicion of harassment, but were released without charge. They claimed the arrest was an act of revenge for exposing David Jones as a major contributor to the blog and accused him of using his masonic connections to arrange their arrests.

Secretary of State for Wales and Minister for Brexit
On 4 September 2012, Jones was promoted to Secretary of State for Wales, and he was in consequence appointed to the Privy Council on 10 September.

Jones stated his top priorities would be to promote economic growth and deliver major infrastructure projects including a new nuclear power station at the Wylfa site on Anglesey, upgrades to rail lines in North Wales and improvements to the M4 motorway and the A55, and exploiting the full economic potential of the Holyhead and Milford Haven Waterway ports.

Issues with the Welsh Government included a Supreme Court challenge by Her Majesty's Government to legislation passed in the Welsh Assembly about local government byelaws and the Welsh government's objection to a Wales Office consultation on changing the boundaries of assembly constituencies.

Jones described the Welsh Government's planning guideline Tan 8 as "an atrocity".

Following Jones leading the Welsh arm of the Vote Leave campaign for the EU referendum, he was appointed as a government Brexit minister in July 2016 under Theresa May. In June 2017, after a reshuffle by her, Jones lost his position.

Personal life
Jones has been married to Sara Tudor, a former nurse, since 1982. The couple have two sons.

Jones is a supporter of Liverpool F.C. Jones declared membership of the Freemasons, although he wrote in 2009 he had not been an active member for many years.

See also
 List of Welsh AMs/MSs with the shortest service

References

Bibliography
 https://www.bbc.co.uk/news/uk-wales-politics-29141800
 http://www.legislation.gov.uk/ukpga/1983/2
 http://www.dailypost.co.uk/news/north-wales-news/llandudno-couple-suing-north-wales-11361115

External links
 David Jones MP official constituency website
David Jones's blog
David Jones MP  Conservative Party profile
Clwyd West Conservatives

|-

|-

|-

1952 births
Alumni of University College London
Conservative Party (UK) MPs for Welsh constituencies
Conservative Party members of the Senedd
Living people
Members of the Privy Council of the United Kingdom
People educated at Ruabon Grammar School
UK MPs 2005–2010
UK MPs 2010–2015
UK MPs 2015–2017
UK MPs 2017–2019
UK MPs 2019–present
Wales AMs 1999–2003
Welsh bloggers
Welsh solicitors
Welsh-speaking politicians
British Eurosceptics